Joseph Paul Vorst (June 19, 1897 – October 15, 1947) was a German-American visual artist.

Biography
Vorst was born June 19, 1897 in Essen, Germany. He studied at the Folkwang Schule in Hagen before serving in World War I, from which he received a permanent limp. He studied art at the National Academy of Berlin with Max Lieberman and Max Slevogt, and was baptized a member of the Church of Jesus Christ of Latter-day Saints in 1924. He emigrated to the U.S. in 1930,  settling in Missouri near his cousins in Ste. Genevieve. He married Lina Weller on June 15, 1935 in St. Louis, Missouri. In the 1930s Vorst was associated with the Ste. Genevieve Art Colony in Ste. Genevieve, Missouri.

He taught art in St. Louis and did much public work for New Deal art projects during the Great Depression. Among other locations Vorst was art director at Jefferson College. According to an article on him in the LDS Improvement Era written by William Mulder he assisted full-time LDS missionaries in St. Louis extensively in sharing the gospel with more people.

He exhibited his work in both the Deseret Gym art room and the Springville Art Museum. An exhibition featuring his life  and work was hosted by the LDS Church History Museum in 2017/2018 in Salt Lake City, UT.

Vorst died in Overland, Missouri on October 15, 1947.

His work is in the collection of the National Gallery of Art, the Saint Louis Art Museum, and the Smithsonian American Art Museum,

Gallery

References

External links

 Joseph Vorst on artnet.com
 Joseph Paul Vorst on AskART
 Joseph Paul Vorst on churchofjesuschrist.org

American muralists
20th-century American painters
American male painters
Modern painters
Section of Painting and Sculpture artists
German military personnel of World War I
Artists from Essen
Artists from St. Louis
1897 births
1947 deaths
German emigrants to the United States
German Latter Day Saints
American Latter Day Saint artists
Converts to Mormonism
20th-century American printmakers
Latter Day Saints from Missouri
20th-century American male artists